Poum is a village in the municipality of Struga, North Macedonia.

Geography
Poum borders Mislodežda to the northwest, Bogojci to the west, Delogoždi to the southeast, Pesočani and Crvena Voda to the northwest, Dolno Tateši in the southwest, the Karaorman Mountain to the north and Botun to the east.

Etymology
The village in Albanian is known as Pohum. The origin of the village's name possibly roots from the compounding of two Albanians words - ‘Po’ and ‘Humb’ - that combine to form the name Pohum/Pohum. According to traditional folklore from the village, the area was initially covered in dense forests, especially oak trees. Two goatherds approached the forests and began to wander within the woodlands, jokingly announcing that they will get lost (“Po humem” in the local Albanian dialect). They stumbled upon a clearing with a stream of water, and would eventually settle in the area due to the favourable conditions available, calling it “Pohum” since the day they first came upon the area. Another theory is that the village's name is possibly derived from an Albanian personal name, such as Pohum or Paum. The attempts to find a Slavic derivation for the name cannot be scientifically explained - they have been part of an unscientific effort to try and give every toponym a Slavic origin for ulterior reasons.

The toponyms of the village are of Albanian origin, such as ‘’Guri i Gjatë, Preshma Kuq, Livadhi i Kaleshit, Vromi i vogëj, Përrenjtë, Prroj Veshit, Brinja e Pusit'' etc.

Anthropology
Poum is inhabited by a vast majority of Albanians. The main families of the village include the Isaku, Naxhaku, Jashari, Dervishi, Zeqiri, Doko, Hasani, Biba, Lloga and Shabani families, all of Albanian origin. Most of these families are native to the village. In the 1583 Defter on the Sanjak of Ohrid, Albanian names were also recorded. The Lloga family is believed to originate from Llogë, a village in the Mati region. The Biba family is said to have originated from the village of Bibaj, in the Mirdita region.

History
Poum is one of the oldest settlements in the Struga region. In the Macedonian archaeological map - “Arheoloska karta na R.M”, Skopje, 1996 - the locality is identified as “kisha” (“church” in Albanian), as it is said that there was once a church and a medieval necropolis. Poum was first mentioned in a defter on the Sanjak of Ohrid created in the year 1583, with the name “Bohun”. The Via Egnatia passed northwest of the village.

The village of Poum and its inhabitants have continuously been involved in a variety of conflicts in the Balkans and across the Ottoman Empire. They have fought against Slav and Ottoman invaders alike. Members of the village, such as Belul Naxhaku, participated in the Ilinden Uprising, as did many other Albanians.

Demographics
As of the 2021 census, Poum had 67 residents with the following ethnic composition:
Albanians 58
Persons for whom data are taken from administrative sources 9

According to the 2002 census, the village had a total of 168 inhabitants. Ethnic groups in the village include:
Albanians 164
Others 4

References

External links

Villages in Struga Municipality
Albanian communities in North Macedonia